Hussam El-Badrawi (born 1935) is an Egyptian former sports shooter. He competed in the trap event at the 1960 Summer Olympics.

References

1935 births
Living people
Egyptian male sport shooters
Olympic shooters of Egypt
Shooters at the 1960 Summer Olympics
People from Dakahlia Governorate